Tatiana Poutchek (born 9 January 1979) is a retired tennis player and current captain of the Belarus Billie Jean King Cup team. Her career-high ranking is No. 55 in the world, achieved on 22 July 2002.

Many of Poutchek's greatest career results came in Tashkent reaching one singles final and seven doubles finals winning five.

In 2002, she made her only WTA Tour singles final there, losing to Marie-Gayanay Mikaelian. In doubles, she won eight titles on the WTA Tour (five in Tashkent, two in Guangzhou, and one in Baku) between 2002 and 2010, and 20 titles on the ITF Women's Circuit between 1997 and 2009.

WTA career finals

Singles: 1 (runner-up)

Doubles: 15 (8 titles, 7 runner-ups)

ITF Circuit finals

Singles: 10 (3–7)

Doubles: 44 (20–24)

Grand Slam doubles performance timeline

References

External links
 
 

1979 births
Living people
Belarusian female tennis players
Olympic tennis players of Belarus
Tennis players from Minsk
Tennis players at the 2008 Summer Olympics